Faun is a 1918 Hungarian silent drama film directed by Alexander Korda and starring Gábor Rajnay, Dezsõ Gyárfás and Artúr Somlay. It was based on a play by Edward Knoblock.

Cast
 Gábor Rajnay - a Faun 
 Dezsõ Gyárfás   
 Artúr Somlay   
 Ica von Lenkeffy  
 Paula Horváth   
 Erzsi Ághy   
 János Ducret   
 Jenõ Horváth   
 Gyula Bartos   
 József Hajdú

References

Bibliography
 Kulik, Karol. Alexander Korda: The Man Who Could Work Miracles. Virgin Books, 1990.

External links

1918 films
Hungarian silent films
Hungarian drama films
1910s Hungarian-language films
Films directed by Alexander Korda
Hungarian films based on plays
Hungarian black-and-white films
1918 drama films
Austro-Hungarian films
Silent drama films